Totally Biased with W. Kamau Bell is an American stand up comedy television series that premiered on FX on August 9, 2012, starring comedian W. Kamau Bell. On stage, Bell did mostly observational comedy on recent news stories and current events. After an opening PowerPoint monologue, the program usually cut to a segment filmed outside of the studio. Additionally, since all of the show's writers were stand-up comedians, many often appeared as correspondents who performed monologues. As the last segment of the program, Bell interviewed a celebrity guest. In order to ensure the show's topicality, most of the show was taped on the day that it was broadcast. In the first episode, Bell interviewed Chris Rock, who was also an executive producer of the show.

It was announced on November 13, 2013, that Totally Biased with W. Kamau Bell had been canceled, and that the final episode would be broadcast the next day.

Episodes

Production
On September 18, 2012, FX ordered an additional seven episodes of Totally Biased that premiered on October 11, 2012, at 11:30 PM ET. Episode 12 ended up airing at 12:00 AM ET on November 16, 2012, because Brand X with Russell Brand had been extended to an hour. On November 27, FX announced the series would have an additional 13 episodes in the first season beginning on January 17, 2013. After a short break during the 2013 portion of season 1, episodes resumed on May 9, 2013, and continued until the season 1 finale on June 20, 2013. With the launch of FXX, the show would air daily at 11:00 PM ET and began its second season on September 4, 2013.

Reception
The premiere episode received mixed reviews. The A.V. Club gave it a B+ and called it "a much better version of Chocolate News, which drops the sketch comedy bent for more explicit social commentary that blends The Daily Show with what Russell Brand wishes he could get on Brand X". The Los Angeles Times also compared Bell and the show favorably to Brand X, saying that "there is a voluble sweetness to his manner that should prove a tonally better companion" to preceding programs. The San Francisco Chronicle applauded the show's edginess, saying that "it makes The Daily Show look like something your dad watches." Newsday gave the show a B- and was more critical, saying that "Rock may want to light a fire under this act sooner than later." The A.V. Club reviewed the first cycle of season one, giving it a B and stating that it has "positive progress to build on going forward. I's certainly in better shape than Brand X, especially when it just lets Bell do his thing in the opening segment. But the longevity of the show will depend on the star finding a way to shape the out-of-studio segments into something more compelling and growing as an interviewer."

See also

 List of late-night American network TV programs

References

External links
 Official Website
 
 Audience Tickets

2012 American television series debuts
2013 American television series endings
2010s American black television series
2010s American late-night television series
2010s American stand-up comedy television series
English-language television shows
FX Networks original programming
FXX original programming